Nikhil Anand (born 26 January 2001) is an Indian cricketer. He made his first-class debut on 4 February 2020, for Bihar in the 2019–20 Ranji Trophy. He made his List A debut on 11 December 2021, for Bihar in the 2021–22 Vijay Hazare Trophy.

References

External links
 

2001 births
Living people
Indian cricketers
Bihar cricketers